The Makhonine Mak-10, was a variable geometry research aircraft, built to investigate variable area / telescopic wings during 1931 in France.

Design and development
In the early 1930s several designers became interested in the possibility of changing the configuration of wings between take off and fast flight. Two routes were explored, the first primarily involving camber and hence lift coefficient reduction and the other a decrease of wing area by span reduction at high speed.  The Schmeidler variable wing and that of the Gloster built Antoni-Breda Ba.15  were examples of the first group and the Makhonine Mak-10 of the second.

The outer panels retracted into the central ones, their inner ends supported on bearings rolling along one or more spars. The ends of the centre section were reinforced with cuffs. The wing apart, it was a conventional cantilever low wing monoplane, with twin open cockpits, the rear one  sometimes faired in, and faired, fixed landing gear.

The first flight of the Mak-10 was on 11 August 1931.

44 years later, the Akaflieg Stuttgart FS-29 experimental high performance sailplane also used telescopic wings to optimise both low speed thermalling and high speed penetration performance without the added induced drag of camber and area changing flaps.

Variants
Mak-10  W-configuration, twelve cylinder Lorraine 12Eb engine.
Mak-101  Gnome-Rhône 14K Mistral Major fourteen cylinder radial engine.

Specifications (Mak-10)

References

Bibliography

External links

Photo of the Makhonine Mak-10
Film of wing deployment, take off and flight

Mak-010
1930s French experimental aircraft
Single-engined tractor aircraft
Low-wing aircraft
Variable-geometry-wing aircraft
Aircraft first flown in 1931